Jay Hickman (April 19, 1955 – March 15, 1993) was a comedian best known for his downhome humor and independently released, often-bawdy material.  Despite his death in the early 1990s, his legacy of Southern-based material still enjoys a cult following.

Biography

Early life
Hickman was born in Winston-Salem, North Carolina and was known as a "truck-stop" comedian, which denotes a genre of comedy that was meant to appeal to a Southern grass roots demographic and whose material was marketed mainly through truck stops.  He started his career at the young age of 15 when he won a North Carolina state talent show, sponsored by the Women's Club of America.  Later, the great comedian Jackie Gleason saw him perform, and one of Gleason's friends quickly hired the unknown comic to perform on cruise ships, eventually progressing to fame performing in strip clubs throughout the Southeastern United States.

Career and fame
It is from those venues that he created and enjoyed a cult, underground following of fans who mainly owned his self-produced cassette tapes of those strip club performances which were self-distributed by him prior to his record deal with Laughing Hyena Records, the same label which discovered comedian Jeff Foxworthy.  A total of 7 CDs were released and are still available through the company's web site.  Hickman also appeared on HBO, Showtime, and The Playboy Channel; performed on the Hee Haw television show; opened shows for comedians Jackie Gleason and Sammy Davis Jr.; and opened concerts for musical artists Tom Jones, Liza Minnelli, Tanya Tucker, Aretha Franklin, Mel Torme, Anita Baker, Lee Greenwood and George Jones.

Death and legacy
Hickman was diagnosed with liver disease in the 1980s and died at 37 in 1993.  He is buried at Southeastern Memorial Gardens Cemetery in Myrtle Beach, South Carolina.

Despite his lack of widespread notoriety, his cult following continues on due to the commitment of Laughing Hyena Records to honor Hickman's last request, for them and only them to continue marketing his CDs for future generations to hear per the testimony of his best friend and company founder, Arnie Hoffman, as found on the inner sleeves of Hickman's CDs.

Arnie had the privilege of a very close friendship with Jay. Jay would call the office of Laughing Hyena almost daily, spreading humor to whoever was lucky enough to answer the phone. When Jay knew his time on earth was coming to a close, he flew his friends out to Myrtle Beach for some ‘guy time,’ saying 'we are going to have a great time, this is about living for today.'

Personal life
Hickman was never married even though he claimed in his performances to have been married 4 times and engaged 11 times.

Albums
 Duke of Dirt (1983) Laughing Hyena Records
 Boat Ride (1983) Laughing Hyena Records
 Making People Laugh (1985) Laughing Hyena Records
 The Macho Man (1986) Laughing Hyena Records
 Playing Truck Driver (1988) Laughing Hyena Records
 Comedy's Bad Boy (1989) Laughing Hyena Records
 Don't Hold Nothing Back (1992) Laughing Hyena Records

Popular material
Perhaps his most enduring story was called "Boat Ride", about a male character with a harelip who takes girls out on a boat ride in order to gain sexual favors ("put out or swim" or as Jay said it, "Put out, or thwim!"), a trick which ultimately turns against him.

External links
Find A Grave's posting of Hickman's obituary from the Florida Sun-Sentinel newspaper
Laughing Hyena Records page for Jay Hickman

1955 births
1993 deaths
People from Raleigh, North Carolina
American stand-up comedians
20th-century American comedians